Falling in Love is a 1935 British comedy film directed by Monty Banks and starring Charles Farrell, Mary Lawson, Diana Napier and Gregory Ratoff. The film was shot at Walton Studios. It was released in the United States the following year under the alternative title Trouble Ahead.

Plot
The manager of an American film star struggles to cope with her behaviour.

Cast
 Charles Farrell as Howard Elliott  
 Mary Lawson as Ann Brent  
 Gregory Ratoff as Oscar Marks  
 H. F. Maltby as Cummins  
 Diana Napier as Gertie  
 Cathleen Nesbitt as Mother 
 Patrick Aherne as Dick Turner  
 Margot Grahame as June Desmond  
 Sally Stewart as Winnie  
 Monty Banks as Film Director  
 Marion Harris as Cafe Singer 
 Pat Fitzpatrick as Jackie 
 Carroll Gibbons and His Orchestra as Themselves
 Eliot Makeham as Caretaker  
 Miles Malleson as Minor Role  
 Wally Patch as Boatman

References

Bibliography
 Low, Rachael. Filmmaking in 1930s Britain. George Allen & Unwin, 1985.
 Wood, Linda. British Films, 1927-1939. British Film Institute, 1986.

External links

1935 films
1935 comedy films
1930s English-language films
Films directed by Monty Banks
British comedy films
Films shot at Nettlefold Studios
Films with screenplays by John Paddy Carstairs
British black-and-white films
1930s British films